Vinod Kumar Vijayan is an Indian film director, writer and producer. He got International Video Festival Award for his first Short Film MASK in age of 18. He also won Berlinale international crystal bear award for  the movie OTTAL. In 2013, he received National Award for his film Annayum Rasoolum. He is known for his works in Malayalam and Telugu cinema. His films include Quotation (2004), Red Salute (2006) and D Company: The Judgement Day (2013).

As Director
Vijayan began assisting with filming under the guidance of K. K. Haridas and Rajeev Ravi. His first film, MASK, has won the International Video Festival award in the category of best short film. His debut in mainstream filmmaking as a director was with the 2004 Malayalam Film Quotation.  Rajeev Ravi was the cinematographer for the film.

His second film as a director was Red Salute, starring Kalabhavan Mani and Sree Devika in lead roles. This film was also the debut film of cinematographer Vinod Illampally and editor Vivek Harshan.

Vijayan also directed Sarva Shiksha Abhiyan, a message-oriented short film for girls' education in India. The film starred child actor Esther Anil as the protagonist.
His next film was malayalam anthology film D Company - The Day of Judgement (2013).Vijayan's installment in the anthology starred Fahadh Faasil and Bhama in lead roles.

As of 2019, Vijayan is directing a Telugu feature film, "OKA PATHAKAM PRAKARAM" starring Sairam Shankar in the lead role. The Cinematography is by Rajeev Ravi, editing by Vivek Harshan, art by Santosh Raman, makeup by Pattanam Shah and Pattanam Rasheed, and musical score by Rahul Raj.

As Producer
Vinod Vijayan has produced a number of films including Annayum Rasoolum (2013), and Ottaal (2015).

Filmography

References

External links
 

Malayalam film directors
Living people
Malayalam film producers
Film directors from Kochi
21st-century Indian film directors
Film producers from Kochi
Year of birth missing (living people)